Vanzago is a comune (municipality) in the Province of Milan in the Italian region Lombardy, located about  northwest of Milan.

The municipality of Vanzago contains the frazioni (subdivisions, mainly villages and hamlets) Mantegazza, Valdarenne, and Tre Campane.

Vanzago borders the following municipalities: Pogliano Milanese, Pregnana Milanese, Arluno, Sedriano.

Demographic evolution

WWF 
The natural area is also known for the WWF (World Wide Fund for Nature) nature reserve, an organisation for the protection of the environment and endangered species. It was established in 1978 under the name of Bosco di Vanzago.

References

External links
 www.comune.vanzago.mi.it/

Cities and towns in Lombardy